is a Japanese cuisine seinen manga series written by Masayuki Qusumi and illustrated by Jiro Taniguchi. It has been adapted into a Japanese television drama series and a Chinese web series. A 10-episode original net animation adaptation premiered on the Production I.G's Tate Anime app on November 29, 2017.

Plot 
As a salesman Gorō Inogashira travels Japan, where he visits various restaurants and street booths to sample the local cuisine. Each chapter features a different place and dish.

TV series

Characters 
 Gorō Inogashira (Yutaka Matsushige)

Episodes

Season 1

Season 2

Season 3

Season 4

Season 5

Season 6

Season 7

Season 8

Season 9

Original net animation 
Published on smartphone app ' Tate Anime '. It was released earlier as a special on October 13, 2017.

Voice actors 

 Inokashira Goro: Horiuchi Keno

Producer 

 Director: Kazuya Kise

References

External links 
Official TV series website 

2017 anime ONAs
2012 Japanese television series debuts
Fusosha Publishing manga
Jiro Taniguchi
Production I.G
Seinen manga
Cooking in anime and manga
TV Tokyo original programming